Janet Claire Mahoney (born 9 September 1953), known professionally as Janet Fielding, is an Australian actress who starred in the BBC science fiction television series Doctor Who as companion Tegan Jovanka.

Early life and career
Fielding was born in Brisbane. After spending some of her childhood schooldays in America, Fielding studied at the University of Queensland, from which she graduated with a degree in English. She planned to become a reporter for the Australian Broadcasting Corporation, and journalism had been a major part of her degree course. Instead, she moved to Britain to become an actress. After arriving in Britain she joined an actors' cooperative.

As 'Janet Clare Fielding' she made her UK TV debut in the Hammer House of Horror episode "Charlie Boy", which aired in October 1980 as it was announced she had been cast as the next Doctor Who companion. She got the Doctor Who companion role after a number of interviews and auditions.

Between 1981 and 1984, Fielding played the part of Tegan Jovanka, a companion of the Fourth Doctor for his four episode story Logopolis only (played by Tom Baker), and later of the Fifth Doctor (Peter Davison) in 18 of his stories, as well as in the regeneration sequence for his final 19th story. She made a guest appearance on Jim'll Fix It in a Doctor Who-related sketch alongside Colin Baker's Doctor in 1985 (A Fix with Sontarans). She played Mel during Sylvester McCoy's audition for the part of the Seventh Doctor. In 1982 she had a small role as the waitress Tracy in the ITV sitcom Shelley. In 1984 she had a role in two ITV series, Minder and the children's drama Murphy's Mob. This was followed in 1985 with a part in another ITV series called Hold the Back Page.

In 1991, Fielding gave up acting to take up an administrative position with Women in Film and Television UK.  While she maintained the administrative position for only three and a half years, she continued with the group afterwards, managing the Skillset study on successful women in television in 2009. During that time, Fielding worked as a theatrical agent, at one point representing Paul McGann when he took the role of the Eighth Doctor.

She returned to acting and the role of Tegan for Big Finish Productions audio plays including The Gathering (2006), Cobwebs and The Cradle of the Snake (2010) alongside Peter Davison as the Fifth Doctor. She had been initially reluctant to reprise her role for Big Finish; at Doctor Who conventions she has stated this reluctance was due primarily to her work as a theatrical agent, as she perceived a potential conflict of interest in working as an actor while representing actors.  She has confirmed that she will continue to appear as Tegan in future audio stories. Fielding has also provided audio commentaries for several DVD releases of Tegan's Doctor Who stories and appeared in DVD extras for Frontier in Space and Planet of the Daleks, stories in which she did not appear, where she provided critiques on the portrayal of female characters in the serials.

Fielding has worked as the head of finance for a charity. She is Project Co-ordinator for Project MotorHouse, a charity based in Ramsgate, UK, which aims to modernise the old motor museum into a multi-use venue featuring offices, bars, a restaurant, a café and cinemas, where local youths will have a chance to learn from successful businesses.

In August 2013, Fielding contributed to the one-off special show Doctor Who Live: The Next Doctor in an interview segment with other companions and Doctors, and she appeared in the 50th-anniversary comedy homage The Five(ish) Doctors Reboot.

Fielding reprised the role of Tegan in the October 2022 Doctor Who BBC centenary special "The Power of the Doctor", alongside Sophie Aldred as Ace.

Personal life
In 1982 Fielding married Daily Mirror foreign editor Nicholas Davies. They divorced in 1991. In September 2012, Fielding revealed she was being treated for cancer.

Filmography

Television

References

External links
Official website

 Where Are They Now? - No.5 Janet Fielding
 Official site for Project MotorHouse

1953 births
Australian television actresses
Living people
Actresses from Brisbane
20th-century Australian actresses
21st-century Australian actresses